The 2011 Tour de San Luis is the 5th edition of the stage race Tour de San Luis. It forms part of the 2010–11 UCI America Tour.

The tour was won by Marco Arriagada riding for the Chile national team.

Teams

Twenty one teams are invited to the 2011 Tour de San Luis

UCI ProTeams

Professional Continental teams

Continental teams

 
 
 Team Nutrixxion
 Team Boavista
 Funvic-Pindamonhangaba
 Centro della Calzatura
 D'Angelo & Antenucci

National teams

 Team Bolivia
 Team Brazil
 Team Argentina
 Team Colombia
 Team Chile
 Team Cuba
 Team Uruguay

Schedule

Stages

Stage 1, San Luis to Justo Daract

Stage 2, Juana Koslay to Mirador del Portero

Stage 3, Buena Esperanza to Villa Mercedes

Stage 4, San Luis to San Luis (ITT)

Stage 5, La Toma to Mirador de Merlo

Stage 6, Estancia Grande to La Carolina

Stage 7, San Luis to San Luis

References

External links

Tour de San Luis
Tour de San Luis
Tour de San Luis
Tour de San Luis